Wahid (foaled 7 November 2002) is a Thoroughbred racehorse who won the New Zealand Derby in 2006.

Biography
The son of Almutawakel grabbed everyone's attention with his stunning debut win at Trentham (covering the 1000m in 57.27 seconds), and was rarely out of the limelight for the remainder of his two-year-old season. With wins in the Wakefield Challenge Stakes and New Zealand Bloodstock Classique and Group 1 placings in both the Diamond Stakes and Manawatu Sires' Produce Stakes he was rightly rated among the very best of his generation at two and was labelled a Derby contender.

He began his three-year-old season quietly while Darci Brahma dominated the main spring races, running in lower-quality company before brilliantly beating the year's best filly in Shikoba in the Group 1 Levin Classic.

After a short break over the summer months he started his Derby campaign at Woodville before heading straight back into stakes company. He won the Wellington Stakes but had the race taken away from him for interference caused to the third horse Abbey Drive, but then had a winning sequence in Group races of three, culminating with the Derby win in March.

One of the most remarkable things about his summer-autumn Derby campaign is that he reversed the style of racing that he had used to such great effect as a two-year-old and spring three-year-old. Instead of coming from off the pace as he had in those two campaigns, he set the pace and led all the way in the Waikato Guineas, Championship Stakes and Derby.

With both Wahid and Darci Brahma being such great successes throughout the season without ever meeting, it is near impossible to say who was the better male three-year-old of the season. With the award controversially given to Darci Brahma after a majority voted for Wahid, the issue remains a source of intense debate.

Wahid's four-year-old season was a disappointment, with the exception of a good fourth-placing in the Kelt Capital Stakes. His five-year-old season started well, with a win at Ellerslie followed up with a third behind champion galloper Xcellent in the Sir James Fletcher Stakes. However, he was found to have a virus at his next start, and did not race for the rest of the season. His six-year-old campaign started with two unplaced runs, followed by a fast-finishing fourth in the Lightning Stakes at Trentham. He came back as a seven-year-old but failed to recapture his best form, and was officially retired in November 2009.

See also
 Thoroughbred racing in New Zealand

References

2002 racehorse births
Racehorses bred in New Zealand
Racehorses trained in New Zealand
Thoroughbred family 1-n